The 2023 CONCACAF Beach Soccer Championship will be the tenth edition of the CONCACAF Beach Soccer Championship, the premier beach soccer tournament contested by North, Central American and Caribbean men's national teams and organised the governing body of football in North America, CONCACAF. The tournament will take place at the Malcolm Park Beach Soccer Facility in Nassau, Bahamas between 8–14 May 2023, with 12 nations contesting the title.

The championship also acts as the qualification tournament for CONCACAF teams to the 2023 FIFA Beach Soccer World Cup in the United Arab Emirates; the top two teams qualify.

El Salvador are the defending champions.

Teams
A total of 12 teams compete in the tournament.

Draw
The draw was held at 11:00 EDT on 17 March 2023 at CONCACAF headquarters in Miami, United States. The 12 teams were drawn into three groups of four.

The procedure was as follows:

The teams were first divided into four pots of three based on their CONCACAF Beach Soccer Ranking as of August 2021. The highest ranked teams were placed in Pot 1, down through to the lowest ranked teams placed in Pot 4. The three teams in Pot 1 were seeded and each automatically assigned to the head of one of the groups. The teams from Pots 2–4 were then drawn, drawing all teams from one pot before moving onto the next.

Group stage
Each team earns three points for a win in regulation time, two points for a win in extra time, one point for a win in a penalty shoot-out, and no points for a defeat. The top two teams from each group and the two best third placed teams advance to the quarter-finals.

All times are local, EDT (UTC−4).

Group A

Group B

Group C

Ranking of third-placed teams

Knockout stage
11 May was allocated as a rest day.

Quarter-finals

Semi-finals
Winners qualify for the 2023 FIFA Beach Soccer World Cup.

Third place match

Final

Qualified teams for FIFA Beach Soccer World Cup
The following two teams from CONCACAF qualify for the 2023 FIFA Beach Soccer World Cup.

1 Bold indicates champions for that year. Italic indicates hosts for that year.

References

External links
, CONCACAF.com
Beach Soccer Worldwide

Beach Soccer Championship
Concacaf
2023
2023 in beach soccer